Janice Alatoa (born October 30, 1988 in Port Vila) is a Vanuatuan sprinter.  She competed in the 100 metres competition at the 2012 Summer Olympics; she ran the preliminaries in 13.60 seconds, which did not qualify her for Round 1.

References

External links
 

1988 births
Living people
Vanuatuan female sprinters
Olympic athletes of Vanuatu
Athletes (track and field) at the 2012 Summer Olympics
People from Port Vila
Olympic female sprinters